Sergei Gur (born June 6, 1978) is a Belarusian former kickboxer from Minsk. He is a former 2004 WMF World Heavyweight Muay Thai champion and two time K-1 Italy tournament champion.

Biography 
Sergei Gur entered K-1 in 2001, following the footsteps of his training partner Alexey Ignashov. He won his first tournament on April 21 in Milan, Italy, by three consecutive TKO's over Danilo Capuzi, Franz Haller and Rani Berbachi. On his next fight he was matched up against three time K-1 World champion Ernesto Hoost in K-1 Oceanian preliminarily held in Melbourne, Australia. Hoost won the fight in the first round by three knockdowns.

Gur's next tournament win in K-1 came in K-1 France GP 2004 held in Marseilles. The win qualified him for K-1 World GP The Battle of Bellagio III, held in Las Vegas, Nevada. Gur lost a hard-fought battle in quarter finals against Mighty Mo by unanimous decision.

Titles 

Professional
2007 K-1 Fighting Network Latvia tournament champion
2007 K-1 Italy tournament runner up
2006 W.B.K.F. Muaythai Eurasian champion -93 kg (0 title defences)
2006 K-1 Italy tournament champion
2005 W.B.K.F. Muaythai Eurasian champion -93 kg (0 title defences)
2004 K-1 Marseilles tournament champion
2003 World Kickboxing Network (W.K.N.) European champion -96 kg
2003 Cup of Arbat tournament runner up -93 kg

Amateur
2005 W.A.K.O. World Championships in Agadir, Morocco  +91 kg (Thai-Boxing) 
2004 W.M.F. Muaythai World Championships in Bangkok, Thailand  +91 kg
2000 I.M.T.F. European champion

Kickboxing record

|-
| 08/23/2016
| Loss
|  Turpal Tokaev
| Akhmat Fight Show
|
| KO 
| 2
| 3:00
|-
| 02/09/2008
| Loss
|  Cătălin Moroşanu
| Local Kombat 27 "Porţile de fier"
| Severin, Romania
| Decision
| 3
| 3:00
|-
| 10/13/2007
| Win
|  Freddy Kemayo
| K-1 World GP 2008 
| Budapest, Hungary
| TKO (Low kicks)
| 2
| 2:53
|-
| 11/30/2007
| Win
| Dzevad Poturak
| Night of Fighters 4
| Bratislava, Slovakia
| Decision
| 3
| 3:00
|-
| 06/09/2007
| Loss 
|  Tomáš Hron
| K-1 Italy Oktagon 2007
| Milan, Italy
| Decision
| 3
| 3:00
|-
| 04/14/2007
| Win
|  Patrice Quarteron
| K-1 Rules Kick Tournament 2007 in Marseilles
| Marseille, France
| TKO
| 3
| 
|-
| 12/06/2006
| Loss
|  Alexei Kudin
| WBKF Eurasian Muay Thai title (+93 kg)
| Moscow, Russia
| Decision (Split)
| 5
| 3:00
|-  
| 06/02/2006
| Loss 
|  Ionuţ Iftimoaie
| Local Kombat 21, Romania
| Decision 
| 3
| 3:00
|- 
| 04/08/2006
| Win
|  Dzevad Poturak
| K-1 Italy Oktagon 2006
| Milan
| Decision
| 3
| 3:00
|-
| 04/08/2006
| Win
|  Freddy Kemayo
| K-1 European League 2006 in Bratislava
| Slovakia
| KO (Flying knee strike)
| 1
| 2:15
|-         
| 01/20/2006
| Loss
|  Rani Berbachi
| K-1 Fighting Network 2006 in Marseilles, France
| Disqualification
| 
| 
|-          
| 12/18/2005
| Loss
|  Ladislav Zak
| Heaven or Hell 5
| Prague, Czech Republic
| Decision
| 3
| 3:00
|- 
| 10/12/2005
| Loss
|  Gregory Tony
| K-1 Italy 2005 Oktagon
| Milan
| Decision
| 3
| 3:00
|- 
| 02/19/2005
| Loss
|  Jorgen Kruth
| WMC World Title
| Stockholm, Sweden
| Decision
| 5
| 3:00
|-           
| 01/29/2005
| Win 
|  Petar Majstorovic
| K-1 MAX Spain 2004
| Guadalajara, Spain
| Decision draw
| 3
| 3:00
|-  
| 10/30/2004
| Win 
|  Roman Kupčák
| Noc Bojovnikov, Bratislava, Sloviakia
| Decision
| 3
| 3:00
|- 
| 08/07/2004
| Loss 
|  Mighty Mo
| K-1 World Grand Prix 2004 in Las Vegas II
| USA
| Decision
| 5
| 3:00
|-           
| 04/24/2004
| style="background: #c5d2ea" |Draw
|  Petar Majstorovic
| K-1 Italy 2004
| Milan, Italy
| Decision 
| 3
| 3:00
|-         
| 03/27/2004
| Win 
|  Jerrel Venetiaan
| K-1 World Grand Prix 2004 in Saitama
|Saitama, Japan 
| Decision (Majority)
| 3
| 3:00
|-         
| 01/24/2004
| Win
|  Humberto Evora
| K-1 Marseilles 2004 World Qualification
| France
| KO
| 2
| 1:35
|- 
| 01/24/2004
| Win
|  Christophe Carron
| K-1 Marseilles 2004 World Qualification
| France
| TKO
| 2
| 1:55
|-
| 01/24/2004
| Win
|  Matthias Riccio
| K-1 Marseilles 2004 World Qualification
| France
| TKO (Referee stoppage)
| 2
| 1:02
|-
| 12/24/2003
| Win
|  Zurab Besiashvili
| WKN European Muay Thai title (96 kg)
| Moscow, Russia
| Decision
| 5
| 3:00
|- 
| 10/31/2003
| Loss
|  Mike Bernardo
| K-1 Final Fight Stars War in Zagreb
| Croatia
| TKO (Referee stoppage)
| 2
| 
|-
| 05/31/2003
| Win 
|  Noboru Uchida
| Tokyo, Japan
| Decision
| 3
| 3:00
|-
| 04/16/2003
| Loss 
|  Vitali Akhramenko
| Cup of Arbat Tournament Final (-93 kg)
| Moscow, Russia
| Decision (Unanimous)
| 5
| 3:00
|- 
| 04/16/2003
| Win
|  Sergei Shemetov
| Cup of Arbat Tournament 1/2 finals (-93 kg)
| Moscow, Russia
| TKO (Referee stop./leg injury) 
| 1
| 
|- 
| 04/16/2003
| Win
|  Timur Porsukov
| Cup of Arbat Tournament 1/4 finals (-93 kg)
| Moscow, Russia
| Decision (Unanimous) 
| 4
| 3:00
|-              
| 02/06/2002
| Win 
|  Nicholas Pettas
| K-1 Survival 2002
| Japan
| TKO (Doctor stoppage)
| 2
| 1:00
|- 
| 06/16/2001
| Loss
|  Ernesto Hoost
| K-1 World Grand Prix 2001 in Melbourne
| Australia
| TKO
| 1
| 2:03
|- 
| 04/21/2001
| Win
|  Rani Berbachi
| K-1 Italy Grand Prix 2001 Preliminary
| Italy
| TKO (Rib injury)
| 3
| 
|-
| 04/21/2001
| Win
|  Franz Haller
| K-1 Italy Grand Prix 2001 Preliminary
| Italy
| KO 
| 1
| 
|-
| 04/21/2001
| Win
|  Danilo Capuzi
| K-1 Italy Grand Prix 2001 Preliminary
| Italy
| KO 
| 2
| 
|-
| 03/14/2001
| Win
|  Topi Helin
| Muay Thai World Championships
| Bangkok, Thailand
| Decision
| 5
| 3:00
|-
| 06/24/2000
| Win
|  Wahid Vueneki
| K-1 Belarus Grand Prix 2000, IMTF European Title
| Minsk, Belarus
| TKO
| 2
| 
|-
| colspan=9 | Legend:

Mixed martial arts record

|- 
| Draw
| align=center | 0-1 (1)
| Vygandas Grazhys
| Draw
| RF 2000 - Lithuania vs Belarus, Lithuania
| 
| align=center| 1
| align=center| 20:00
|
|  
|-  
| Loss 
| align=center| 0-1
| Andrei Semenov
| Submission (Armbar)
| M-1 MFC - Russia Open Tournament
| 
| align=center| 1
| align=center| 1:17
|
|
|}

See also
List of male kickboxers
List of K-1 events

External links 
Official K-1 Sergei Gur profile

References 

Belarusian male kickboxers
Heavyweight kickboxers
Belarusian male mixed martial artists
Light heavyweight mixed martial artists
Mixed martial artists utilizing Muay Thai
Mixed martial artists utilizing kickboxing
Belarusian Muay Thai practitioners
Sportspeople from Minsk
1978 births
Living people
SUPERKOMBAT kickboxers